Ford Freeway can refer to:
Bishop Ford Freeway, part of I-94 in the Chicago area
Edsel Ford Freeway, part of I-94 in Detroit
Gerald R. Ford Freeway (Omaha), part of I-480 in Nebraska
Gerald R. Ford Freeway (Grand Rapids), part of I-196 in Michigan